Major-General Leslie "Pete" de Malapert Thuillier, CB, CVO, OBE, (26 September 1905 – 23 March 1999) was a British Army officer of the Royal Corps of Signals who served with distinction in the Second World War and later set up the hotline between 10 Downing Street and The White House.

His grandfather was Henry Ravenshaw Thuillier, and his great-grandfather was Henry Edward Landor Thuillier, both Surveyor Generals of India.

Selected publications
Everest Observed

References 

1905 births
1999 deaths
Royal Corps of Signals officers
Members of the Order of the British Empire
20th-century British businesspeople
British Army personnel of World War II
Leslie
Commanders of the Royal Victorian Order